Auri is a Finnish band composed of vocalist and violinist Johanna Kurkela, keyboardist and backing vocalist Tuomas Holopainen, and guitarist, keyboardist and pipe player Troy Donockley. Holopainen and Donockley are also members of Finnish band Nightwish. Their self-titled first album, Auri, was released on March 23, 2018. and was recorded at Peter Gabriel's Real World Studios.

Holopainen described Auri's style as "rabbit hole music and celestial metal" with "influences from folk music, Celtic music, [and] soundtracks". British rock magazine Prog describes the band as prog folk. The band's name is based on a female character from The Kingkiller Chronicle.

History
Auri was formed by friends Tuomas Holopainen, Troy Donockley and Johanna Kurkela. According to an interview, the music concept for Auri dates back to 2011 when the trio realized they will have to do music together. However, their ongoing responsibilities with other projects prevented them from doing so, until 2017 when they finally had available free time to work on this project. The promotional photoshoot for the band and album inspired and forced them to complete the recording: 

The band's name is based on a female character from Patrick Rothfuss' The Kingkiller Chronicle: 

On 17 October 2020, it was announced that Auri had completed work on the second album. The second album, titled II – Those We Don't Speak Of was later released on 3 September 2021.

Members
Johanna Kurkela – lead vocals
Tuomas Holopainen – keyboards, piano, synthesizers
Troy Donockley – guitars, Uilleann pipes, low whistle, male vocals, backing vocals

Discography
Albums
Auri (2018) – No. 2 Finland
II – Those We Don't Speak Of (2021) – No. 2 Finland

Singles
"Night 13" (2018)
"The Space Between" (2018)
"Pearl Diving" (2021)
"The Valley" (2021)

Music videos
"Night 13" (2017)

References

External links

Finnish musical groups
Musical groups established in 2017
Nuclear Blast artists
2017 establishments in Finland